Claudiu Belu-Iordache  (born 7 November 1993) is a Romanian professional footballer who plays as a right-back for Liga I club Rapid București.

Club career

Politehnica Timișoara
Belu he started his career playing for the club in his hometown Politehnica Timișoara.He made his senior debut playing all the 90 minutes in a game which his team won 2–0 away from home against Bihor Oradea in Liga II on 17 March 2012.

Concordia Chiajna
In June 2012, Belu joined Liga I side Concordia Chiajna.

Poli Timișoara
On 28 June 2013, Poli Timișoara announced the signing of Belu.

Târgu Mureș
In August 2016, Belu signed a one-year contract with Liga I club Târgu Mureș.

Astra Giurgiu
On 10 January 2017, Belu joined Liga I side Astra Giurgiu. On 31 March 2019, Astra Giurgiu decided to terminate the player's contract because ’’ Belu had a different point of view than his colleagues and taking into account his contractual situation, today the two sides, the club and the player decided the amicable termination of the commitment'’, announced the club in a press release on the official site.

FCSB
In March 2019, Belu agreed to join Liga I club FCSB, effective from 1 July 2019.

Voluntari
On 24 January 2020, Belu joined Liga I club Voluntari until the end of the season.

Rapid Bucuresti
On 16 June 2021, Rapid announced the signing of Belu.

Career statistics

Club

Honours
Politehnica Timișoara
Liga II: 2011–12

ACS Poli Timișoara
Liga II: 2014–15

Astra Giurgiu
Cupa României runner-up: 2016–17, 2018–19

References

External links
 
 

1993 births
Living people
Sportspeople from Timișoara
Romanian footballers
Romania under-21 international footballers
Association football defenders
FC Politehnica Timișoara players
CS Concordia Chiajna players
ACS Poli Timișoara players
ASA 2013 Târgu Mureș players
FC Astra Giurgiu players
FC Steaua București players
FC Voluntari players
FC Hermannstadt players
FC Rapid București players
Liga I players
Liga II players